Halstead's Point was an unincorporated community in York County, Virginia. In 1918, during World War I, a large tract of land in the area including Halstead's Point was taken by the U.S. Navy to create a military base initially known as a mine depot, where ordnance for military shifts was handled. Today, the lost town of Halstead's Point is unrecognizable, but was located near the Gate 3 of the US Naval Weapons Station Yorktown just off State Route 143 and east of Interstate 64.

See also

Lackey, Virginia
Grove, Virginia
Penniman, Virginia

Sources

Publications
McCartney, Martha W. (1977) James City County: Keystone of the Commonwealth; James City County, Virginia; Donning and Company;

Websites
"Cast Down Your Buckets Where You Are" An Ethnohistorical Study of the African-American Community on the Lands of the Yorktown Naval Weapons Station 1865-1918

Halstead's Point